Ehren Kruger (born October 5, 1972) is an American film screenwriter and producer. He is best known for writing three of the five installments in the original Transformers film series: Revenge of the Fallen, Dark of the Moon, and Age of Extinction, in addition to the American version of The Ring and its sequel The Ring Two and the American adaptation of Ghost in the Shell.

For his work on Top Gun: Maverick, Kruger was nominated for the Academy Award for Best Adapted Screenplay.

Life and career
Kruger was raised in Alexandria, Virginia, and attended the Thomas Jefferson High School for Science and Technology, graduating in 1990. He graduated from the New York University Tisch School of the Arts in 1993 with a Bachelor of Fine Arts degree.

His produced screenplays include Arlington Road, Scream 3 and Reindeer Games. He was nominated for the Bram Stoker Award for Best Screenplay for The Ring.

He also did uncredited rewrites to Scream 4, when Kevin Williamson had to leave production.

Early on in his career after penning the screenplay Arlington Road, he received the Nicholl Fellowship from the Academy of Motion Picture Arts and Sciences in 1996. Kruger wrote the script of the television series adaptation of Terry Gilliam's film The Brothers Grimm.

Filmography

Uncredited rewrites
 Dracula 2000 (2000)
 Texas Rangers (2001)
 Mindhunters (2004)
 Scream 4 (2011)

Producer only
 Scream 4 (2011) (Executive producer)
 Dream House (2011)
 Rings (2017) (Executive producer)
 Ophelia (2018)

References

External links

1972 births
Living people
20th-century American screenwriters
21st-century American screenwriters
American film producers
American male screenwriters
Screenwriters from Virginia
Thomas Jefferson High School for Science and Technology alumni
Tisch School of the Arts alumni
Writers from Alexandria, Virginia
20th-century American male writers
21st-century American male writers